Bugthorpe is a village and civil parish in the East Riding of Yorkshire, England, about  east of York and  west of Driffield. The village is just south of the border with North Yorkshire. According to the 2011 UK Census the civil parish had a population of 103, a decrease on the 2001 UK Census figure of 122.
 
St Andrew's Church stands in the village and was designated a Grade I listed building in 1966 and is now recorded in the National Heritage List for England, maintained by Historic England. Next to the church is the village green.

Low Hall is also designated as a Grade II* listed building.

There are road links from the village to Skirpenbeck, Barthorpe Bottoms, Kirby Underdale, and the main A166 York to Bridlington road.

Bugthorpe has a village post office, a brewery and a small school.

References

External links

Villages in the East Riding of Yorkshire
Civil parishes in the East Riding of Yorkshire